By the Sweat of Your Brow is a 1949 Argentine film directed by Román Viñoly Barreto.

Cast
Armando Bo		
Diana Ingro			
Alba Múgica 			
Ernesto Bianco 	
Raúl del Valle 		
Oscar Combi 	
Domingo Garibotto

References

External links
 

1949 films
1940s Spanish-language films
Argentine black-and-white films
Films directed by Román Viñoly Barreto
Films with screenplays by Tulio Demicheli
Argentine drama films
1949 drama films
1940s Argentine films